Love Belongs to Everyone  (original Dutch title: Dennis van Rita, literally Dennis from Rita) is a 2006 Flemish film directed by Hilde Van Mieghem and written by Hugo Van Laere. It stars Els Dottermans, Matthias Schoenaerts and Veerle Baetens.

Plot
Dennis (Schoenaerts) is 26 years old but has the mind of a child. He is obsessed with trains and train schedules. His mother Rita (Dottermans) is overjoyed when Dennis returns from prison after serving a sentence for the alleged rape of an underage girl. The neighborhood, however, is not happy with Dennis' homecoming, especially Barbara (Baetens).

After Dennis masturbates at the playground – with his pants on – Rita and his father André (Damiaan De Schrijver) decide to keep him inside. However, when Rita is at her work, André is watching Dennis but falls asleeps. In this timeframe, Dennis goes outside to see the trains but does not return. Later on the evening, the police tell them that Dennis raped a woman (Maaike Neuville). Dennis is found in a train station.

Dennis is being interrogated by an alienist. He concludes there is no proper psychiatric institution where Dennis can be handled, so he is sent to jail, where he is beaten and harassed by the other prisoners. The guards, who despise sex offenders, do nothing to help him. Eventually, Dennis tries to kill himself.

Rita contacts Thomas (Tom Van Dyck), a lawyer who coincidentally happens to be Barbara's boyfriend. A medical examination proves the girl was indeed raped by Dennis. Thomas thinks Dennis belongs in a psychiatric institution, not prison, so he tries to convince the judge. Barbara changes her mind after a quarrel with Thomas. She initially hoped Rita and her family would move or Dennis would be locked up forever, but never realized Dennis does need professional help.

They try to petition the government for Dennis' release, and are able to make an appearance on a famous Belgian debate television show. Some days later, Rita gets a letter from a psychiatric institution which will accept Dennis as a patient. There, Dennis explains that the girl took him to an abandoned place as she claimed to know all about trains and schedules. She told she was cold so he gave her his sweater. She stroked his belly, but he told her she must not do that as it is forbidden. As she kept going on and looked at him very nicely, he pushed the girl away. She hit her head, knocking her unconscious. Dennis thought she was dead and removed the sweater. He felt her warm belly and became aroused, leading to the rape.

The trial and judgment are not revealed.

Principal cast
Els Dottermans as Rita
Matthias Schoenaerts as Dennis
Veerle Baetens as Barbara
Damiaan De Schrijver
Hans de Munter as psychiater
Rudolph Segers as inmate
Tom Van Dyck

Awards and nominations

Won
Shanghai International Film Festival
Best Actress (Dottermans)
Best Screenplay (Van Laere)

External links
 Official Website
 
 Love Belongs to Everyone at Rotten Tomatoes
 Love Belongs to Everyone at Filmow
 Trailer on Vimeo

2006 films
Belgian drama films
2000s Dutch-language films
Films set in Belgium
Films set in Flanders
Films shot in Belgium
Films about intellectual disability
Films about pedophilia
Films about rape
Films set in prison